Gallardoa is a monotypic genus of flowering plants belonging to the family Malpighiaceae. The only species is Gallardoa fischeri.

It is native to Argentina.

It is named in honour of Ángel Gallardo (1867–1934), an Argentine civil engineer, natural scientist and politician. It was first described and published in Physis (Buenos Aires) Vol.2 on page 101 in 1916.

References

Malpighiaceae
Malpighiaceae genera
Monotypic Malpighiales genera
Plants described in 1916
Flora of Argentina